"If I Lose Myself" is a song recorded by American pop rock band OneRepublic for their third studio album, Native (2013). It was released as the album's first official single on January 8, 2013. The song was written by Ryan Tedder, Benny Blanco, Brent Kutzle and Zach Filkins. It was produced by Tedder and Blanco while Kutzle served as the co-producer. The song peaked at number 74 on the US Billboard Hot 100 and number 6 on the Media Control Charts in Germany. In early 2014, the single was re-released in the UK after the huge success of "Counting Stars".

Writing and inspiration
OneRepublic frontman Ryan Tedder told Billboard about the song's lyrics: "It's actually about my buried, latent fear of flying and going down in an airplane, having that moment of sheer panic, looking out the window, seeing your life pass before you and somehow finding comfort in the fact that the person next to you is experiencing the same traumatic event."

Composition

"If I Lose Myself" runs for 4:01 minutes and has a tempo of 140 beats per minute.

Live performances
On March 28, 2013, OneRepublic performed "If I Lose Myself" on American Idol with former Idol contestant and NBC Smash star Katharine McPhee. They also performed on Good Morning America, The Ellen Degeneres Show and Rachael Ray, as well as several other concerts and festivals.

Music video
In an interview with fuse.tv, Tedder said, "The original concept [for the video] was borrowing from the opening scene of Garden State—the plane's going down and all the oxygen masks drop out and everyone's going crazy... We chased that for a minute but realized... It's one thing to watch that kind of video once, but you don't wanna sit there and hit repeat on watching a plane crash."

The music video was released on January 24, 2013. In the video, a group of people are sent a text from Ryan Tedder, of a picture of a wolf and the numbers 11.11.11 at the bottom. The camera follows the group around the city chasing clues that are spray painted on fire hydrants and street signs around the town that will help them guide their way to a secret concert that OneRepublic is holding. The video cuts to scenes of the band performing the song in a dark, smokey room with colored lights surrounding the room with a bunch of fans dancing. There are pictures of owls and foxes being projected around the room which are allusions to the album cover for Native. At the end of the video, there is a fox being projected on Tedder's face. The video was inspired by the movies 12 Monkeys and The Matrix.

The video has over 90 million views as of January 2021. It is one of the top ten most viewed OneRepublic music videos.

Track listing
Digital download
"If I Lose Myself" – 4:01

Digital download – remix
"If I Lose Myself" (OneRepublic vs Alesso) – 3:34

CD single
"If I Lose Myself" (Album version) – 4:01
"If I Lose Myself" (Love Thy Brother remix) – 4:03

Credits and personnel
Recording
Recorded at Black Rock Studios, Santorini, Greece; The Warehouse Studio, Vancouver, British Columbia; Lotzah Matzah Studios, New York City, New York; Patriot Studios, Denver, Colorado; Downtown Studios, New York City, New York; Orion Studio, Orange County, California
Mixed at MixStar Studios, Virginia Beach, Virginia
Mastered at Sterling Sound, New York

Personnel

Songwriting – Ryan Tedder, Benny Blanco, Brent Kutzle, Zach Filkins
Production – Benny Blanco, Ryan Tedder
Co-production – Brent Kutzle
Mixing – Serban Ghenea
Engineering – Smith Carlson, Ryan Tedder
Assistant engineering – Scott "Yarmov" Yarmovsky, Chris Sclafani, Matthew Tryba

Backing vocals – Zach Filkins, Drew Brown, Eddie Fisher, Brent Kutzle, David McGlohon
Instrumentation and programming – Benny Blanco, Ryan Tedder, Brent Kutzle, OneRepublic
Mix engineering – John Hanes
Assistant mix engineering – Phil Seaford
Mastering – Chris Gehringer, Will Quinnell

Charts and certifications

Weekly charts

Year-end charts

Certifications

Release history

Alesso vs. OneRepublic version

A progressive house version of the song remixed by Swedish producer Alesso was played for the first time at the Ultra Music Festival in Miami, Florida on March 24, 2013 and was released in certain countries on March 30, notably Netherlands and Sweden, charting with a version credited to OneRepublic vs. Alesso. "If I Lose Myself" was promoted and released in the United Kingdom and Australia in February 2014. This remix was later featured on both the UK and US reissue of the group's album, Native, as well as Alesso's debut album, Forever (2015).

The remix was nominated for a Grammy Award in the category Best Remixed Recording, Non-Classical. Alesso explained:

Track listing
Digital download
"If I Lose Myself" (OneRepublic vs. Alesso) – 3:34

Digital download — extended remix
"If I Lose Myself" (OneRepublic vs. Alesso) (extended remix) – 7:08

Charts and certifications

Charts

Certifications

References

2013 singles
OneRepublic songs
Songs written by Ryan Tedder
2013 songs
Songs written by Zach Filkins
Songs written by Eddie Fisher (drummer)
Interscope Records singles
Mosley Music Group singles
Songs written by Brent Kutzle
Songs written by Benny Blanco
Song recordings produced by Benny Blanco
Song recordings produced by Ryan Tedder
Song recordings produced by Alesso